Blow the Man Down is a 2019 American black comedy thriller film, written and directed by Bridget Savage Cole and Danielle Krudy. It stars Morgan Saylor, Sophie Lowe, Annette O'Toole, Marceline Hugot, Gayle Rankin, Will Brittain, Skipp Sudduth, Ebon Moss-Bachrach, June Squibb, and Margo Martindale.

It had its world premiere at the Tribeca Film Festival on April 26, 2019. It was released on March 20, 2020, by Amazon Studios.

Plot 
Priscilla and Mary Beth Connolly are sisters living in the small fishing town of Easter Cove, Maine, whose mother has recently died.  At the wake, Doreen Burke, Susie Gallagher, and Gail Maguire, contemporaries of their mother, offer condolences.  Mary Beth learns that the family fishmonger business is in trouble and that their mother took out a loan against the house which could jeopardize their continued ownership of it. After arguing with Priscilla, she storms out and heads to a bar.  Mary Beth begins drinking with a man named Gorski.  Later she is driving him home, but crashes the car when he caresses her leg.  When they get out to inspect the damage, the trunk accidentally opens and Mary Beth sees blood inside.  Gorski attempts to force himself on her and she flees.  When he follows her, she stabs him with a harpoon and then bashes his head in with a brick.

Mary Beth returns home covered in blood to a shocked Priscilla, who calls the police, but changes her mind and hangs up. Priscilla helps Mary Beth get rid of Gorski's body, using a knife to chop up his arms to make the body fit in a cooler box that they then throw into the ocean. The next day, Priscilla can’t find the knife they used, which has ‘Connolly Fish’ written on it. Mary Beth goes to Gorski's shack to find the knife, but instead finds a bag containing $50,000. Later, Enid, a brothel owner, sees the Connolly knife in Gorski's shack.

Local policeman Brennan asks to borrow the Connolly's boat, indicating that a body has washed up on shore.  Priscilla is terrified that it is Gorski but it turns out be a woman named Dee, who worked for Enid.  Brennan and his older partner Colletti interview Enid, who tries to steer them away from the brothel.  Brennan finds her suspicious, but is warned off by Colletti, who has known Enid for years.  Priscilla and Mary Beth talk to Doreen who reveals that years ago she, Susie, Gail, and their mother had made a decision: to satisfy the lusts of the fishermen, and protect their own daughters, they allowed Enid to open the Oceanview brothel.

Brennan and Coletti find Gorski’s car, which has a gun inside, and blood and a terrible smell in the trunk.  The officers are sure that Gorski must be the murderer. Meanwhile, Alexis, one of Enid’s working girls, knowing Enid owed Dee money, believes Enid had her killed. Enid blackmails the Connolly sisters to bring back the money they took from Gorski's shack in exchange for the knife she found there.  The sisters decide to confess everything to the police the following day. That night, Officer Brennan, who is attracted to Priscilla, comes over for dinner and asks them about the call made to the police the night of the murder.  They change their mind about confessing.  Gail, Susie, and Doreen go to confront Enid.  Telling her that she has crossed a line, they inform her that they will no longer allow her to operate the brothel and that she should leave town.  Brennan has drinks with a friend and learns that Mary Beth had been seen with Gorski the night he disappeared.

The Connolly sisters go to Enid and return the money. She tells them how much she misses their mother and how their mother left the brothel business to protect the two of them. She offers them some of the money and tells them that they could work for her after it runs out. When they refuse the money, Enid turns angry, calling them names before drunkenly collapsing. The girls get the knife and leave. Alexis, having overheard the whole thing, enters Enid’s room and smothers her to death with a pillow. She takes the money and leaves town with one of the other girls from the brothel. Doreen notices something in the water.

Gail comes to see Coletti about Oceanview. The next morning he informs Brennan that they're going to close down Oceanview.  They see Priscilla and Mary Beth walking down the street, but Brennan says he isn't interested in Priscilla anymore.  The sisters pass by Gail and Doreen, who are singing "Blow the Man Down", and then see Susie washing out the cooler which had contained Gorski's body.  Susie smiles at them.

Cast
 Morgan Saylor as Mary Beth Connolly
 Sophie Lowe as Priscilla Connolly
 Annette O'Toole as Gail Maguire
 Marceline Hugot as Doreen Burke
 Gayle Rankin as Alexis
 Will Brittain as Officer Justin Brennan
 Skipp Sudduth as Officer Coletti
 Ebon Moss-Bachrach as Gorski

 June Squibb as Susie Gallagher

 Margo Martindale as Enid Nora Devlin

Production
Filming began in February 2018 in Harpswell, Maine. The name of the town in the film is changed to Easter Cove, Maine.

Release
It had its world premiere at the Tribeca Film Festival on April 26, 2019. Shortly after, Amazon Studios acquired distribution rights to the film. It also screened at the Toronto International Film Festival on September 12, 2019.  It was released exclusively on Amazon Prime Video on March 20, 2020.

Critical reception
Blow the Man Down received positive reviews from film critics. The site's critical consensus reads, "Clever, funny, and original, Blow the Man Down is one hell of a ride that should not be missed." On Metacritic, the film holds a rating of 72 out of 100, based on 20 critics, indicating "generally favorable reviews".

Accolades

References

External links
 
 
 

2019 films
2019 black comedy films
2019 comedy-drama films
2010s comedy thriller films
Amazon Studios films
American black comedy films
American comedy-drama films
American comedy thriller films
Films about sisters
Films set in Maine
Films shot in Maine
Amazon Prime Video original films
2010s English-language films
2010s American films